Oak Place (also known as the Steele-Fowler House) is a historic residence in Huntsville, Alabama.  It was built by renowned Huntsville architect George Steele in 1840 on 320 acres (130 ha).  Steele designed a number of buildings across the South, including the First National Bank building in Huntsville, and the second Madison County Courthouse, which stood from 1840 until 1914.  Similar to many of his buildings, Steele designed Oak Place house in a Greek Revival style, although much more restrained in detail.

The house has a low hipped roof, and is three stories, although it appears as two stories with a basement due to its unusual interior layout.  The façade has three steps leading to a one-story, flat-roofed portico supported by two square Doric columns on the corners and two fluted Doric columns in the middle.  The entablature is the most decorated part of the house, although it is limited to groups of vertical strakes.  Windows flanking the portico are six-over-nine sashes surrounded by square pilasters and Doric capitals with plain entablature and cornice.  The interior layout was different than the standard home of the day.  It features a central entrance hall, with a large ballroom with 14-foot (4.2-m) ceilings to one side, and two smaller rooms several steps above on the other.  In the basement below the two smaller rooms is a dining room, taking advantage of the higher ceiling.  There are four bedrooms on the second floor.  Like the exterior, the interior was restrained.

Many details were lost when it was converted from a house to a church school building by the East Huntsville Baptist Church.  The house was listed on the National Register of Historic Places in 1974.

References

National Register of Historic Places in Huntsville, Alabama
Houses on the National Register of Historic Places in Alabama
Greek Revival houses in Alabama
Houses completed in 1840
Houses in Huntsville, Alabama